Tapirus tarijensis is an extinct species of tapir that lived during the Pleistocene epoch. Fossils of the species have been found in the Tarija Formation of Bolivia.

References 

Prehistoric tapirs
Pleistocene mammals of South America
Ensenadan
Pleistocene Bolivia
Fossils of Bolivia